"We Bring Good Things to Life" was an advertising slogan used by General Electric between 1979 and 2003. It was designed by the advertising firm BBDO led by project manager Richard Costello, who would later go on to become head of advertising at General Electric. The slogan was designed to highlight the diversity of the products and services the company offered. The slogan, after its many appearances in GE advertising, was responsible for increased popularity and a new image for the company.

Overview 

For many, the name General Electric brings to mind the company's famous slogan “We Bring Good Things to Life.” The slogan is a reflection of the company that has moved far beyond its origins as an electric generating company and maker of electrical appliances. By the 1990s, GE had become a highly diversified worldwide conglomerate that continued to sell lighting products and appliances; but also dealt in aircraft engines, capital services, industrial systems, information services, medical systems, plastics, power systems, and transportation systems. GE's 1986 acquisition of RCA, which included the NBC network, signaled a gradual shift in company emphasis to service and technology industries. GE was the only company that had remained on the Dow Jones Industrial Average Index since 1896. Its “We Bring Good Things to Life” advertising campaign focused on GE's message and helped it bring all of the company's interests to the public's attention under one umbrella theme.

Historical context 

General Electric was created in 1892 when Thomas Edison’s Edison Electric Company merged with Thomson-Houston. GE was heavily involved in the electrification of railways in the late 1880s and by the turn of the century was manufacturing everything related to electrification from industrial electric motors to light bulbs and locomotives. In 1896, GE and the Westinghouse Company entered into a patent pool, effectively eliminating competition in the electrification industry in an era when the United States was entering the electric age.

From its beginnings, GE emphasized research to create many products and product improvements. The company has been awarded more patents than almost any other company in the United States. GE began creating consumer products in the early 20th century, beginning with a line of toasters. After GE merged with other companies, more and more consumer appliances such as irons and refrigerators began to be sold under the GE or Hotpoint brand names.

By the 1970s, GE had shifted once again to a focus to the service and high-tech fields. In this increasingly diversified market, the company saw that a more comprehensive advertising strategy was needed. Prior to 1979, GE’s image was primarily that of an appliance company. Each one of the company’s products and services used its own advertising theme, not an overall company slogan. To remedy the situation, the advertising agency BBDO began to develop the “We Bring Good Things to Life” campaign to create a unified brand image.

A far more likely source of the campaign idea may come more directly from the words of one of General Electric's most famous employees Charles Proteus Steinmetz (1865-1923) who is quoted as saying of his work: "Some day we make the good things of life for everybody."

Target market 

Market research done by BBDO showed that in the 1970s, GE was still seen as a dependable and trusted American company, but a typical GE customer was perceived to be older, low-income, blue-collar, and unsophisticated, and GE products to be somewhat old fashioned and below standard. As a result, except in the area of lighting products, brand commitment to GE lagged behind its competitors. GE saw the need to change the company's brand recognition and to create an updated, single message that could translate across many product lines and services. GE's stated objective for the new campaign was to increase customer awareness of GE products and to foster more product loyalty. Additionally, GE sought to increase employee morale and heighten its image in the financial world, in government, in the retail business sector, and in public consciousness. GE also tried to stimulate a more upscale consumer base, made up of adults between the ages of 25 and 54. The new campaign was more appropriate to the information age, in which consumers were constantly bombarded with advertising images from a variety of media.

Marketing strategy 

When GE advertising was consolidated in 1979 with BBDO, the “Good Things” slogan was not only incorporated into media ads but also induced on all packaging, spec sheets and brochures, and service trucks. When GE sponsored a television program, the ad agency used a number of “We Bring Good Things to Life” commercials, each telling the GE story in a different way. Aside from promoting products and services, GE commercials and print ads began to project a new corporate image, stressing how the company's products and services had enhanced people's lives. Since GE had previously been identified with consumer products, this shift in emphasis was significant. The advertising budget on this campaign was approximately $100 million.

Outcome 

“We Bring Good Things to Life” was extremely successful and became the longest running corporate advertising campaign. It did not take long for consumers to see GE as more than a producer of electrical household products. By the early 1990s, GE was among the most recognized brands in the United States along with Coca-Cola and IBM. According to research by BBDO, consumers were also beginning to see GE as a more competitive, energetic, and approachable company than ever before, and the consumer base was becoming younger and more affluent. The company also ranked high in customer satisfaction after the release of this advertising campaign.

Notes 

General Electric
American advertising slogans
1979 neologisms